The 2006 Men's Australian Hockey League was the 16th edition of the men's field hockey tournament. The tournament was held from 17 April through to 21 May 2006 at various venues, before culminating in Hobart for the finals.

QLD Blades won the tournament for the fourth time after defeating the Tassie Tigers 1–0 in the final. Azuma Vikings finished in third place after defeating WA Thundersticks 5–4 in penalties after a 5–5 draw in the third and fourth place playoff.

Participating teams

 Canberra Lakers
 NSW Waratahs
 Territory Stingers
 QLD Blades
 Adelaide Hotshots
 Tassie Tigers
 Azuma Vikings
 WA Thundersticks

Competition format
The 2006 Men's Australian Hockey League consisted of a single round robin format, followed by classification matches. 

Teams from all 8 states and territories competed against one another throughout the pool stage. At the conclusion of the pool stage, the top four ranked teams progressed to the semi-finals, while the bottom four teams continued to the classification stage.

The first four rounds of the pool stage comprised two-legged fixtures between states. As a result, matches in rounds five to seven of the pool stage were worth double points, due to the single-leg format.

Point allocation

Every match in the 2006 AHL needed an outright result. In the event of a draw, golden goal extra time was played out, and if the result was still a draw a penalty shoot-out was contested, with the winner receiving a bonus point.

Results

Preliminary round

Fixtures

Classification round

Fifth to eighth place classification

Crossover

Seventh and eighth place

Fifth and sixth place

First to fourth place classification

Semi-finals

Third and fourth place

Final

Awards

Statistics

Final standings

Goalscorers

References

External links

2006
2006 in Australian men's field hockey